I briganti may refer to:

I briganti (Mercadante), 1836 opera
I briganti, 1841 opera by Luigi Arditi
I briganti, 1916 film by Percy Nash with Diana D'Amore, Ignazio Lupi, Sandro Ruffini
I briganti, 1983 film with Al Cliver